Around the Bend is a 2004 film

Around the Bend may also refer to:

Around the Bend (album), by Randy Travis, 2008.
"Around the Bend", song by The Asteroids Galaxy Tour from Fruit, 2009.
"Around the Bend", song by Pearl Jam from No Code, 1996.]
"Around the Bend", song by Martha Wainwright from Goodnight City, 2016.
"Around the Bend", etude about pitch bending for oboe solo by Juan María Solare, 2022.